Sulcosticta is a genus of shadowdamsel in the damselfly family Platystictidae. There are about five described species in Sulcosticta.

Species
These five species belong to the genus Sulcosticta:
 Sulcosticta pallida van Tol, 2005
 Sulcosticta sierramadrensis Villanueva, Van Der Ploeg & Van Weerd, 2011
 Sulcosticta striata van Tol, 2005
 Sulcosticta vantoli Villanueva & Schorr, 2011
 Sulcosticta viticula van Tol, 2005

References

Further reading

 
 
 

Platystictidae
Articles created by Qbugbot